Laevipilina cachuchensis is a species of monoplacophoran, a superficially limpet-like marine mollusk. Two live specimens were collected off the coast of Asturias, northern Spain during the Fauna Ibérica II expedition in 1991.

References

Monoplacophora
Molluscs described in 2005